Paulo Luiz Massariol, commonly known as just Paulinho (born April 3, 1958), is a former Brazilian football forward, who played in several Série A clubs. He was the top goalscorer of the Série A 1978.

Career
Born in São Paulo, Paulinho started his professional career with XV de Piracicaba. Paulinho played 69 Série A games for Vasco between 1977 and 1980, scoring 28 goals, and finished as the Série A 1978 with 19 goals. He then played six Série A games for Palmeiras in 1981, scoring three goals, moving to Grêmio in 1982, in which he scored a goal in 12 Série A games. Paulinho defended Comercial-RP in 1983, and retired in 1989.

References

External links

Living people
1958 births
Brazilian footballers
Brazilian expatriate footballers
Esporte Clube XV de Novembro (Piracicaba) players
CR Vasco da Gama players
Sociedade Esportiva Palmeiras players
Grêmio Foot-Ball Porto Alegrense players
Comercial Futebol Clube (Ribeirão Preto) players
Campeonato Brasileiro Série A players
Liga MX players
Brazil under-20 international footballers
Expatriate footballers in Mexico
Footballers from São Paulo
Association football forwards